Eunoe spinicirris is a scale worm described from the Sea of Japan at depths of 30–200m.

Description
Number of segments 42; elytra 15 pairs. Dorsum brown with white longitudinal band. Prostomium anterior margin comprising a pair of acute anterior projections. Lateral antennae inserted ventrally (beneath prostomium and median antenna). Elytra marginal fringe of papillae present. Notochaetae distinctly thicker than neurochaetae. Bidentate neurochaetae absent.

References

Phyllodocida